Stony Creek is an unincorporated community in LaGrange County, Indiana, in the United States.

Stony Creek was founded when the railroad was extended to that point.

References

Unincorporated communities in LaGrange County, Indiana
Unincorporated communities in Indiana